Işıklar is a village in the Baskil District of Elazığ Province in Turkey. The village had a population of 158 in 2021.

The hamlets of Hacıhasan, Işıklar and Tuzluca are attached to the village.

References

Villages in Baskil District